"Aller plus haut" (English: "Go Higher") is a 1999 song recorded by Australian singer Tina Arena. It was the eighth single from the album In Deep and was released in July 1999. It was also Arena's first French language single. J. Kapler was inspired to write the song and offer it to Tina Arena after seeing her perform in English on French television. The song became a huge hit in Belgium (Wallonia) where it topped the chart for one week and remained in the top 40 for 21 weeks, and in France, where it charted for 40 weeks and peaked at #2 for six consecutive weeks.

The song was also included on Arena's best of Souvenirs, Greatest Hits 1994–2004 and The Best & le meilleur. A live version of the song is available on Vous êtes toujours là.

The song was covered in 2001 by Lara Fabian, Daniel Levi and Roch Voisine on Les Enfoirés' album L'Odyssée des Enfoirés. In 2005, Arena recorded a new version as a duet with Les 500 Choristes for the album 500 Choristes – avec..., which appears on the CD maxi for "Aimer jusqu'à l'impossible".

Track listings
CD single
 "Aller plus haut" – 4:00
 "Now I Can Dance" (live) – 5:53

7" single
A-side:
 "Aller plus haut" – 4:00
B-side:
 "Aller plus haut" – 4:00

CD promo
 "Aller plus haut" – 4:00

Charts and certifications

Weekly charts

Year-end charts

Certifications

References

1997 songs
1999 singles
Ultratop 50 Singles (Wallonia) number-one singles
Tina Arena songs
Songs written by Robert Goldman (songwriter)